= Apisa Air Cargo =

IATA	ICAO	Call sign
—	PIC	Apisa
- Commenced operations: 1985
- Ceased operations: 1997
- Fleet size: See Fleet details below
- Destinations: See Company history below
- Headquarters: Lima, Peru

Apisa Air Cargo (ICAO: PIC) was a cargo/freight airline based in Peru that began operations in 1985 and ceased flying in 1997.

== Company history ==
Apisa Air Cargo began operating using Douglas DC-8-54F aircraft transporting meat to Lima from Barranquilla and Asunción. In 1989 a Douglas DC-8-33F was acquired for the Lima-Iquitos-Lima route and the Lima-Puerto Maldonado-Lima route. This DC-8-33F had a hard landing at Iquitos during bad weather and the aircraft suffered about 80% damage and had to be written off.

Due to the loss of the DC-8, Apisa acquired a Boeing 707-320C from Million Air of Florida and with that aircraft it got a provisional permit to operate a cargo route Lima-Miami-Lima transporting mostly cattle and textiles. Also, flights from Lima to Toronto began on a charter basis using a Boeing 707-338C. But due to pressure from other Peruvian airlines, the permit to operate those routes was cancelled.

Apisa tried to keep operations going by forming a partnership with KLM and Iberia to transfer cargo, but the end came in 1997 when the permits to operate were revoked by the Peruvian government.

== Fleet details ==
- 1 – Douglas DC-8-33F
- 1 – Douglas DC-8-54F
- 1 – Boeing 707-320C
- 1 – Boeing 707-338C
